The Lacto-phage-1 RNA motif is a conserved RNA structure that was discovered by bioinformatics.
Lacto-phage-1 motif RNAs are found in Lactobacillales.

It is ambiguous whether Lacto-phage-1 RNAs function as cis-regulatory elements or whether they operate in trans, as there are not enough examples to draw a conclusion.  Many Lacto-phage-1 RNAs are associated with the phage gene arpU, and presumably are present in prophages.

References

Non-coding RNA